Just a Man may refer to:

 "Just a Man (The Cruel Sea song)", 1995
 "Just a Man", 2002 song by Mark Morrison from Innocent Man (Mark Morrison album)
 "Just a Man", 1995 song by Faith No More from King for a Day... Fool for a Lifetime
 "Just a Man" (Flashpoint episode), a season 2 episode
 Just a Man: The Real Michael Hutchence, 2000 biography by Tina Hutchence and Patricia Glassop
 "Just a Man", 2022 song by Jorge Rivera-Herrans, Epic the musical: The Troy Saga Concept Album

See also
 "Am I Just a Man", 2010 song by Steve Mason
 I'm Just a Man, 1997 song by INXS from Elegantly Wasted
 Just Like a Man, 1992 song recorded by Lill Lindfors
 One Just Man (disambiguation)